The 1940 Wisconsin gubernatorial election was held on November 5, 1940.

Incumbent Republican Governor Julius P. Heil defeated Progressive nominee Orland Steen Loomis and Democratic nominee Francis E. McGovern with 40.67% of the vote.

Primary elections
Primary elections were held on September 17, 1940.

Democratic primary

Candidates
William R. Callahan, Democratic nominee for Secretary of State of Wisconsin in 1938
Raymond J. Cannon, former U.S. Representative
Gerhard A. Hagedorn, electrical salesman
Francis E. McGovern, former Governor

Withdrawn
William B. Rubin

Results

Republican primary

Candidates
Julius P. Heil, incumbent Governor
James K. Robinson, dentist, unsuccessful candidate for Progressive nomination for Lieutenant Governor in 1936

Results

Progressive primary

Candidates
Paul Alfonsi, former Speaker of the Wisconsin State Assembly
Henry Gunderson, former Lieutenant Governor
Orland Steen Loomis, former Attorney General of Wisconsin
Philip E. Nelson, incumbent State Senator
Harold E. Stafford, attorney

Results

General election

Candidates
Major party candidates
Orland Steen Loomis, Democratic
Julius P. Heil, Republican
Francis E. McGovern, Progressive

Other candidates
Fred B. Blair, Communist, candidate for Governor in 1932
Louis Fisher, Socialist Labor

Results

References

Bibliography
 
 

1940
Wisconsin
Gubernatorial
November 1940 events